Ohio Grass is the fifth release by the American blues rock band Buffalo Killers. The album was released for Record Store Day on April 20, 2013. It features 7 studio recordings and 3 live recordings. Alive Naturalsound Records released the album on limited-edition colored vinyl, as well as on CD.

Track listing
All songs composed and arranged by Andrew Gabbard and Zachary Gabbard.

 "Baptized" – 3:07
 "Nothing Can Bring Me Down" – 3:12
 "Grow Your Own" – 3:51
 "Golden Eagle" – 5:16
 "Hold You Me" – 4:38
 "Some Other Kind" – 3:03
 "Good Feeling*" – 3:42
 "Jon Jacob (Live)*" – 3:04
 "Hey Girl (Live)*" – 4:26
 "Move On (Live)*" – 3:42

Personnel
 Andrew Gabbard – guitar, vocals, piano
 Zachary Gabbard – bass guitar, vocals, guitar
 Joseph Sebaali – drums, piano, harpsichord

Production
 Buffalo Killers – production
 Mike Montgomery – recording and mixing
 Joshua Marc Levy & Asheville Art family  – art direction, design and illustration
Live tracks captured by Arthur Creech

References

2013 albums
Buffalo Killers albums
Alive Naturalsound Records albums